Danjon may refer to:
 André-Louis Danjon (1890–1967), French astronomer
 Danjon scale, used for measuring lunar eclipse brightness
 Danjon (crater), a lunar crater